Anita O'Day at Mister Kelly's is a 1958 live album by Anita O'Day, recorded at Mister Kelly's in Chicago.

Reception
The Allmusic review by Richard S. Ginell awarded the album 4 stars stating "Caught live with just her piano trio at Chicago's famous now-defunct nightclub, Anita O'Day is in an ebullient mood as she tosses off a series of standards and novelties. Whether this is an accurate snapshot of her live act is open to question; the stage business in between numbers seems rather formal and one doesn't really feel the excitement of a live performance. Yet O'Day is clearly in a creative mood, whether allowing her vulnerability to show in the torchy ballads or reveling in the boppish up-tempo workouts. Her vocal on "Tea for Two" is a virtuoso deconstruction, full of satiric quotes and rhythmic shifts at a warp-speed tempo. Fleet-fingered Joe Masters decorates the fills with standard bop runs on the slightly-out-of-tune house piano.".

Track listing
"But Not for Me" (George Gershwin, Ira Gershwin) – 3:09
"I Have a Reason for Living" (Joe Albany, Aileen Albany) – 4:52
"Varsity Drag" (Lew Brown, Buddy DeSylva, Ray Henderson) – 1:51
"My Love for You" (Edward Heyman, Harry Jacobson) – 3:06
"It Never Entered My Mind" (Lorenz Hart, Richard Rodgers) – 3:58
"Tea for Two" (Irving Caesar, Vincent Youmans) – 2:17
"Every Time I'm with You" – 2:08
"Have You Met Miss Jones?" (Hart, Rodgers) – 2:37
"The Wildest Gal in Town" – 3:05
"Star Eyes" (Gene de Paul, Don Raye) – 3:04
"Loneliness Is a Well" (Joe Albany, Aileen Albany) – 3:17
"The Song Is You" (Oscar Hammerstein II, Jerome Kern)

Personnel
Anita O'Day – vocals
Joe Masters – piano
John Poole – drums
L.B. Wood – bass

References

1958 live albums
Anita O'Day live albums
Verve Records live albums
Albums recorded at Mister Kelly's